Southern India Electronic Industries Chamber (SIEIC), is a non-government, not-for-profit, industry-led and industry-managed organization, whose primary function is to work for the development of electronic industries in South India. SIEIC which is a registered society promoted by cluster of companies belongs to ESDM (electronic system design & manufacturing) sector in the state of Tamil Nadu. The chamber is closely working with Department of Electronics and Information Technology, (DeitY) to break through the disabilities that we have in the electronic MSME companies to create a better eco-system in the value chain of electronics manufacturing. Also addressing the very big technological gap prevailing in the Indian MSME electronic industries and has created incapability and struggle to compete the global business environment.

History 

Southern India Electronic Industries Chamber was founded with about 20 members, registered office is at VIT University, VIT-TBI, Vellore in 2015. Mr Nagarajan S is its first president and founder of this chamber. G. Viswanathan, chancellor of VIT University, Vellore is highly supporting for promoting this chamber for the development of electronic industries.

SIEIC has formed a group of 15 Electronic System Design and Manufacturing (ESDM) companies to set up an Electronic Common Facility Centre (CFC) in the Vellore district of Tamil Nadu as part of the Union Ministry of Electronics programm.

Goal
The goal of the Electronic Chamber is to promote activities towards skill & knowledge development, research & development and technology transfer in the industries. Unfortunately many of the Indian electronics MSME companies are not aware and get
exposed to the schemes promoted under national policy of electronics. By being knowing this unhealthy situation in the MSME sector, SIEIC take lead in creating awareness about the schemes to bring better eco system for the development of electronics in India.

Programs

On 27 November 2015, Southern India Electronic Industries Chamber (SIEIC) has organized a state-level meet in Chennai, Saveetha Engineering College to create awareness of various government schemes that would improve the eco-system in the value chain of electronics manufacturing in the state.

References

External links 
 News about State level program in Chennai

Organisations based in Tamil Nadu
Trade associations based in India
2015 establishments in Tamil Nadu
Organizations established in 2015